Albert Hector James O'Dee (17 July 1896 – 5 June 1982) was an Australian rules football player at the Fitzroy Football Club in the Victorian Football League (VFL).

Football
He became a premiership player at Fitzroy, playing in the 1916 VFL Grand Final, under the captaincy of Wally Johnson, with George Holden as coach. O'Dee made his debut for Fitzroy against  in Round 15 of the 1915 VFL season, at the Brunswick Street Oval.

Notes

References

External links
 
 

1896 births
1982 deaths
Australian rules footballers from Victoria (Australia)
Players of Australian handball
Fitzroy Football Club players
Fitzroy Football Club Premiership players
One-time VFL/AFL Premiership players
People from Fitzroy, Victoria